The 2021 New York Mets season was the franchise's 60th season, the team's 13th season at Citi Field, and their first season under new majority owner Steve Cohen. The Mets began the 2021 season 35-25 and held first place in the National League East at the All-Star break. The Mets stumbled along the way, losing first place in early August to the Atlanta Braves. On September 25, the Mets were eliminated from playoff contention in a 2–1 loss to the Milwaukee Brewers, continuing a five-year-long playoff drought. On September 26, the team suffered its 82nd loss, sealing their fourth losing season in five years. The Mets spent 103 days in first place, marking the most days in MLB history a team has been in first and finished with a losing record. The Mets finished the regular season 77–85, giving them a third place finish. On October 4, Luis Rojas was declined his club option as manager, following the conclusion of the regular season.
Their division rival, Atlanta Braves, went on to win the World Series to leave the Mets as the only NL East team to not win the title in the 21st century.

Uniform
The 2021 season will be the first since the 2012 season that the team's iconic late 1990s-2000s era black alternate uniforms will be worn, but only for select home game days. On July 15, the team announced that starting July 30, the Mets will wear their black jerseys every home Friday game for the rest of the year. It will be the first time since July 12, 2012, that the team wore the black alternates. The Mets suited up in the throwback tops on August 13 against the Dodgers, August 27 against the Nationals, September 10 against the Yankees, and September 17 against the Phillies.

Offseason

Transactions

2020
November 30 – right-handed reliever Jacob Barnes signs a 1-year, $750,000 contract with the Mets.
December 2 – right-handed reliever Trevor May signs a 2-year deal with the Mets for $15.5 million.
December 15 – catcher James McCann signs a 4-year, $40.6 million contract with the Mets.
December 22 – Noah Syndergaard re-signs with the Mets for a 1-year contract for $9.7 million.

2021
January 7 – acquired right-handed pitcher Carlos Carrasco and shortstop Francisco Lindor from the Cleveland Indians for infielders Amed Rosario and Andrés Giménez, and two prospects (Josh Wolf, and Isaiah Greene).
January 8 – acquired left-handed pitcher Stephen Tarpley from the Miami Marlins off waivers.
January 14 – utility player José Martinez signs with the Mets for a 1-year, $1 million contract.
January 15 – Edwin Díaz re-signs with the Mets for a one-year deal worth $7 million. Seth Lugo re-signs with the Mets for a 1-year, $2.925 million contract. Robert Gsellman re-signs with the Mets for a 1-year $1.3 million deal. Brandon Nimmo re-signs with the Mets for a 1-year, $4.7 million contract. Michael Conforto re-signs with the Mets for a 1-year contract worth $12.250 million. Dominic Smith re-signs with the Mets for a 1-year, $2.550 million contract.
January 30 – left-handed pitcher Aaron Loup signs with the Mets for a 1-year, $3 million contract.
February 10 – acquired outfielder Khalil Lee from the Kansas City Royals for right-handed pitcher Josh Winckowski and a player to be named to the Boston Red Sox.
February 11 – infielder Jonathan Villar signs with the Mets for a 1-year, $3.55 million contract.
February 20 – right-handed pitcher Taijuan Walker signs a two-year, $20 million contract with a player option for the 2023 season.
February 21 – outfielder Kevin Pillar signs with the Mets for a 1-year, $5 million contract.
March 31 – shortstop Francisco Lindor signs an extension with the Mets for a 10-year, $341 million contract.

Regular season

Transactions

2021
May 18 – acquired outfielder Cameron Maybin from the Chicago Cubs in exchange for cash considerations.
May 25 – acquired outfielder Billy McKinney from the Milwaukee Brewers in exchange for minor league pitcher Pedro Quintana.
July 21 – acquired minor league outfielder Carlos Rincon from the Los Angeles Dodgers and cash considerations in exchange for Billy McKinney. Mets also claimed right-hander Roel Ramírez off waivers from the St. Louis Cardinals.
July 30 – acquired shortstop/second baseman Javier Báez and right-handed pitcher Trevor Williams from the Chicago Cubs for minor league outfielder Pete Crow-Armstrong.

Season standings

National League East

National League Division Leaders

Record vs. opponents

Game log 

|- style="background:#bbb
| – || April 1 || @ Nationals || colspan=8| Postponed (COVID-19, makeup date June 19)
|- style="background:#bbb
| – || April 3 || @ Nationals || colspan=8| Postponed (COVID-19, makeup date June 28)
|- style="background:#bbb
| – || April 4 || @ Nationals || colspan=8| Postponed (COVID-19, makeup date September 4)
|- style="background:#fbb;"
| 1 || April 5 || @ Phillies || 3–5 || Brogdon (2–0) || May (0–1) || Alvarado (1) || Citizens Bank Park (10,782) || 0–1
|- style="background:#bfb;
| 2 || April 6 || @ Phillies || 8–4 || Stroman (1–0)|| Anderson (0–1) || — || Citizens Bank Park (10,752) || 1–1
|- style="background:#fbb;
| 3 || April 7 || @ Phillies || 2–8 || Brogdon (3–0) || Peterson (0–1) || — || Citizens Bank Park (10,807) || 1–2
|- style="background:#bfb;
| 4 || April 8 || Marlins || 3–2 || Díaz (1–0) || Bass (0–2) || — || Citi Field (8,492) || 2–2
|- style="background:#fbb;"
| 5 || April 10 || Marlins || 0–3 || Rogers (1–1) || deGrom (0–1) || García (1) || Citi Field (8,419) || 2–3
|- style="background:#bbb;
| – || April 11 || Marlins || colspan=8| Suspended (Rain, continuation date: August 31)
|- style="background:#bbb;" 
| – || April 12 || Phillies || colspan=8| Postponed (Rain, Makeup: April 13)
|- style="background:#bfb;"
| 6 || April 13  || Phillies || 4–3  || May (1–1) || Neris (0–1) || — || Citi Field (N/A) || 3–3
|- style="background:#bfb;"
| 7 || April 13  || Phillies || 4–0  || Stroman (2–0) || Nola (0–1) || — || Citi Field (7,611) || 4–3
|- style="background:#bfb;"
| 8 || April 14 || Phillies || 5–1 || Peterson (1–1) || Wheeler (1–2) || — || Citi Field (7,520) || 5–3
|- style="background:#bbb;"
| – || April 15 || Phillies || colspan=8| Postponed (Rain, Makeup: June 25)
|- style="background:#bbb;"
| – || April 16 || @ Rockies || colspan=8| Postponed (Snow, Makeup: April 17)
|- style="background:#bfb;"
| 9 || April 17  || @ Rockies || 4–3  || deGrom (1–1) || Bard (0–1) || Díaz (1) || Coors Field (N/A) || 6–3
|- style="background:#fbb;"
| 10 || April 17  || @ Rockies || 2–7  || Márquez (1–1) || Lucchesi (0–1) || — || Coors Field (13,906) || 6–4
|- style="background:#bfb;"
| 11 || April 18 || @ Rockies || 2–1 || Stroman (3–0) || Senzatela (1–3) || Díaz (2) || Coors Field (15,082) || 7–4
|- style="background:#fbb;"
| 12 || April 20 || @ Cubs || 1–3 || Arrieta (3–1) || Walker (0–1) || Kimbrel (4) || Wrigley Field (10,137) || 7–5
|- style="background:#fbb;"
| 13 || April 21 || @ Cubs || 4–16 || Mills (1–0) || Peterson (1–2) || — || Wrigley Field (10,196) || 7–6
|- style="background:#fbb;"
| 14 || April 22 || @ Cubs || 3–4  || Winkler (1–0) || Díaz (1–1) || — || Wrigley Field (10,343) || 7–7 
|- style="background:#bfb;"
| 15 || April 23 || Nationals || 6–0 || deGrom (2–1) || Fedde (1–2) || — || Citi Field (8,130) || 8–7
|- style="background:#fbb;"
| 16 || April 24 || Nationals || 1–7 || Ross (2–1) || Stroman (3–1) || — || Citi Field (8,051) || 8–8
|- style="background:#bfb;"
| 17 || April 25 || Nationals || 4–0 || Walker (1–1) || Corbin (0–3) || — || Citi Field (7,784) || 9–8
|- style="background:#fbb;"
| 18 || April 27 || Red Sox || 1–2 || Richards (1–2) || Peterson (1–3) || Barnes (5) || Citi Field (7,917) || 9–9
|- style="background:#fbb;"
| 19 || April 28 || Red Sox || 0–1 || Pivetta (3–0) || deGrom (2–2) || Barnes (6) || Citi Field (8,051) || 9–10
|- style="background:#fbb;"
| 20 || April 30 || @ Phillies || 1–2 || Anderson (1–3) || Stroman (3–2) || Coonrod (1) || Citizens Bank Park (10,914) || 9–11
|-

|- style="background:#bfb;
| 21 || May 1 || @ Phillies || 5–4 || May (2–1) || Neris (1–3) || Díaz (3) || Citizens Bank Park (10,948) || 10–11 
|- style="background:#bfb;
| 22 || May 2 || @ Phillies || 8–7 || Barnes (1–0) || Kintzler (1–1)|| Familia (1) || Citizens Bank Park (10,964) || 11–11 
|- style="background:#fbb;"
| 23 || May 3 || @ Cardinals || 5–6 || Wainwright (1–3) || Lucchesi (0–2) || Reyes (8) || Busch Stadium (12,686) || 11–12
|- style="background:#bbb;" 
| — || May 4 || @ Cardinals || colspan=8| Postponed (Rain, Makeup: May 5)
|- style="background:#fbb;"
| 24 || May 5  || @ Cardinals || 1–4  || Helsley (3–0) || Stroman (3–3) || Reyes (9) || Busch Stadium (N/A) || 11–13
|- style="background:#bfb;"
| 25 || May 5  || @ Cardinals || 7–2  ||Yamamoto (1–0) || Oviedo (0–1) || — || Busch Stadium (13,187) || 12–13
|- style="background:#bfb;"
| 26 || May 6 || @ Cardinals || 4–1 || Walker (2–1) || Gant (2–3) || Díaz (4) || Busch Stadium (12,939) || 13–13
|- style="background:#bfb;"
| 27 || May 7 || Diamondbacks || 5–4  || Loup (1–0) || Crichton (0–1) || — || Citi Field (7,662) || 14–13
|- style="background:#bfb;" 
| 28 || May 8 || Diamondbacks || 4–2 || Lucchesi (1–2) || Kelly (2–3) || May (1) || Citi Field (7,908) || 15–13
|- style="background:#bfb;" 
| 29 || May 9 || Diamondbacks || 4–2 || deGrom (3–2) || Smith (1–2) || Díaz (5) || Citi Field (7,880) || 16–13
|- style="background:#bfb;" 
| 30 || May 11 || Orioles || 3–2 || Familia (1–0) || Valdez (2–1) || — || Citi Field (7,930) || 17–13
|- style="background:#bfb;" 
| 31 || May 12 || Orioles || 7–1 || Walker (3–1) || Harvey (3–3) || — || Citi Field (8,035) || 18–13
|- style="background:#fbb;"
| 32 || May 14 || @ Rays || 2–3 || Fairbanks (1–0) || Castro (0–1) || — || Tropicana Field (7,123) || 18–14
|- style="background:#fbb;"
| 33 || May 15 || @ Rays || 5–12 || McClanahan (1–0) || Lucchesi (1–3) || — || Tropicana Field (7,536) || 18–15 
|- style="background:#fbb;" 
| 34 || May 16 || @ Rays || 1–7 || Fleming (3–3) || Stroman (3–4) || — || Tropicana Field (7,355) || 18–16 
|- style="background:#bfb;" 
| 35 || May 17 || @ Braves || 3–1 || Reid-Foley (1–0) || Fried (1–2) || Díaz (6) || Truist Park (22,691) || 19–16
|- style="background:#bfb 
| 36 || May 18 || @ Braves || 4–3 || Familia (2–0) || Smith (0–4) || Díaz (7) || Truist Park (41,149) || 20–16 
|- style="background:#fbb;" 
| 37 || May 19 || @ Braves || 4–5 || Smith (1–4) || Barnes (1–1) || — || Truist Park (22,619) || 20–17
|- style="background:#bfb;" 
| 38 || May 21 || @ Marlins || 6–5  || Smith (1–0) || Cimber (0–1) || Barnes (1) || LoanDepot Park (7,282) || 21–17
|- style="background:#fbb;" 
| 39 || May 22 || @ Marlins || 1–3 || García (3–2) || Smith (1–1) || — || LoanDepot Park (7,513) || 21–18
|- style="background:#fbb;" 
| 40 || May 23 || @ Marlins || 1–5 || Poteet (2–0) || Yamamoto (1–1) || — || LoanDepot Park (7,945) || 21–19 
|- style="background:#fbb;" 
| 41 || May 24 || Rockies || 2–3 || Gomber (3–4) || Peterson (1–4) || Estévez (1) || Citi Field (8,438) || 21–20
|- style="background:#bfb;" 
| 42 || May 25 || Rockies || 3–1 || Castro (1–1) || Gonzalez (2–3) || Díaz (8) || Citi Field (9,190) || 22–20
|- style="background:#bbb;" 
| — || May 26 || Rockies || colspan=8| Postponed (Rain, Makeup: May 27)
|- style="background:#bfb;" 
| 43 || May 27  || Rockies || 1–0  || Stroman (4–4) || Márquez (3–5) || Díaz (9) || Citi Field (N/A) || 23–20
|- style="background:#bfb;" 
| 44 || May 27  || Rockies || 4–2  || Loup (2–0) || Senzatela (1–5) || Barnes (2) || Citi Field (9,569) || 24–20
|- style="background:#bbb;" 
| — || May 28 || Braves || colspan=8| Postponed (Rain, Makeup: June 21)
|- style="background:#bfb;" 
| 45 || May 29 || Braves || 13–2 || Walker (4–1) || Anderson (4–2) || — || Citi Field (10,251) || 25–20
|- style="background:#bbb;" 
| — || May 30 || Braves || colspan=8| Postponed (Rain, Makeup: July 26)
|- style="background:#bfb;" 
| 46 || May 31 || @ Diamondbacks || 6–2 || deGrom (4–2) || Kelly (2–6) || — || Chase Field (11,309) || 26–20
|-

|- style="background:#fbb;" 
| 47 || June 1 || @ Diamondbacks || 5–6  || Young (2–4) || May (2–2) || — || Chase Field (9,590) || 26–21
|- style="background:#bfb;" 
| 48 || June 2 || @ Diamondbacks || 7–6 || Castro (2–1) || Soria (0–1) || Díaz (10) || Chase Field (9,810) || 27–21
|- style="background:#fbb;" 
| 49 || June 3 || @ Padres || 3–4 || Darvish (6–1) || Walker (4–2) || Melancon (18) || Petco Park (15,250) || 27–22
|- style="background:#fbb;" 
| 50 || June 4 || @ Padres || 0–2 || Snell (2–2) || Lucchesi (1–4) || Melancon (19) || Petco Park (15,250) || 27–23
|- style="background:#bfb;" 
| 51 || June 5 || @ Padres || 4–0 || deGrom (5–2) || Musgrove (4–5) || — || Petco Park (15,250) || 28–23
|- style="background:#bfb;" 
| 52 || June 6 || @ Padres || 6–2 || Stroman (5–4) || Paddack (2–5) || — || Petco Park (15,250) || 29–23
|- style="background:#fbb;" 
| 53 || June 8 || @ Orioles || 3–10 || Zimmermann (4–3) || Peterson (1–5) || — || Camden Yards (9,431) || 29–24
|- style="background:#bfb;" 
| 54 || June 9 || @ Orioles || 14–1 || Walker (5–2) || Harvey (3–7) || — || Camden Yards (9,584) || 30–24
|- style="background:#bfb;"
| 55 || June 11 || Padres || 3–2 || deGrom (6–2) || Snell (2–3) || Díaz (11) || Citi Field (26,637) || 31–24
|- style="background:#bfb;" 
| 56 || June 12 || Padres || 4–1 || Stroman (6–4) || Musgrove (4–6) || Díaz (12) || Citi Field (25,463) || 32–24
|- style="background:#fbb;"
| 57 || June 13 || Padres || 3–7 || Paddack (3–5) || Familia (2–1) || — || Citi Field (19,581) || 32–25
|- style="background:#bfb;"
| 58 || June 14 || Cubs || 5–2 || Peterson (2–5) || Arrieta (5–7) || Díaz (13) || Citi Field (16,383) || 33–25
|- style="background:#bfb;" 
| 59 || June 15 || Cubs || 3–2 || Walker (6–2) || Mills (2–1) || Lugo (1) || Citi Field (17,804) || 34–25
|- style="background:#bfb;" 
| 60 || June 16 || Cubs || 6–3 || Reid-Foley (2–0) || Stock (0–1) || Díaz (14) || Citi Field (23,545) || 35–25
|- style="background:#fbb;" 
| 61 || June 17 || Cubs || 0–2 || Hendricks (9–4) || Stroman (6–5) || Kimbrel (19) || Citi Field (16,826) || 35–26
|- style="background:#fbb;" 
| 62 || June 18 || @ Nationals || 0–1 || Hand (4–2) || Díaz (1–2) || — || Nationals Park (26,246) || 35–27 
|- style="background:#bfb;" 
| 63 || June 19  || @ Nationals || 5–1  || Loup (2–0) || Ross (3–7) || — || Nationals Park (14,434) || 36–27 
|- style="background:#fbb;" 
| 64 || June 19  || @ Nationals || 2–6  || Lester (1–2) || Gsellman (0–1) || Hand (14) || Nationals Park (22,111) || 36–28
|- style="background:#fbb;" 
| 65 || June 20 || @ Nationals || 2–5 || Corbin (5–5) || Walker (6–3) || Hand (15) || Nationals Park (30,374) || 36–29
|- style="background:#bfb;" 
| 66 || June 21  || Braves || 4–2  || deGrom (7–2) || Muller (0–1) || Díaz (15) || Citi Field (N/A) || 37–29
|- style="background:#fbb;"
| 67 || June 21  || Braves || 0–1  || Anderson (5–3) || Castro (2–2) || Smith (14) || Citi Field (18,698) || 37–30
|- style="background:#fbb;" 
| 68 || June 22 || Braves || 0–3 || Morton (7–3) || Díaz (0–1) || Smith (15) || Citi Field (17,063) || 37–31
|- style="background:#bfb;" 
| 69 || June 23 || Braves || 7–3 || Oswalt (1–0) || Wright (0–1) || Díaz (16) || Citi Field (15,645) || 38–31
|- style="background:#bfb;"
| 70 || June 25  || Phillies || 2–1  || Lugo (1–0) || Suárez (3–2) || — || Citi Field (N/A) || 39–31
|- style="background:#fbb;"  
| 71 || June 25  || Phillies || 1–2  || Bradley (3–1) || Reid-Foley (2–1) || Neris (11) || Citi Field (29,012) || 39–32
|- style="background:#bfb;" 
| 72 || June 26 || Phillies || 4–3 || Díaz (2–2) || Neris (1–5) || — || Citi Field (29,205) || 40–32
|- style="background:#fbb;" 
| 73 || June 27 || Phillies || 2–4 || Wheeler (6–4) || Stroman (6–6) || Bradley (1) || Citi Field (25,488) || 40–33
|- style="background:#fbb;" 
| 74 || June 28 || @ Nationals || 4–8 || Espino (2–2) || Eickhoff (0–1) || Hand (17) || Nationals Park (19,150) || 40–34
|- style="background:#bfb;" 
| 75 || June 29 || @ Braves || 4–3 || Smith (3–1) || Minter (1–3) || Díaz (17) || Truist Park (29,274) || 41–34 
|- style="background:#fbb;" 
| 76 || June 30 || @ Braves || 2–20 || Fried (5–4) || Peterson (2–6) || — || Truist Park (28,405) || 41–35
|-

|- style="background:#fbb;" 
| 77 || July 1 || @ Braves || 3–4 || Smith (2–5) || Lugo (1–1) || — || Truist Park (35,777) || 41–36 
|- style="background:#bbb;" 
| — || July 2 || @ Yankees || colspan=8| Postponed (Rain, Makeup: July 4) 
|- style="background:#bfb;" 
| 78 || July 3 || @ Yankees || 8–3 || Walker (7–3) || Montgomery (3–3) || — || Yankee Stadium (40,047) || 42–36
|- style="background:#bfb;" 
| 79 || July 4  || @ Yankees || 10–5  || Familia (3–1) || Chapman (5–3) || — || Yankee Stadium (42,714) || 43–36
|- style="background:#fbb;" 
| 80 || July 4  || @ Yankees || 2–4  || Green (3–4) || Oswalt (1–1) || — || Yankee Stadium (42,107) || 43–37
|- style="background:#bfb;" 
| 81 || July 5 || Brewers || 4–2 || Lugo (2–1) || Woodruff (7–4) || Díaz (18) || Citi Field (15,145) || 44–37
|- style="background:#bbb;" 
| — || July 6 || Brewers || colspan=8| Postponed (Rain, Makeup: July 7)
|- style="background:#bfb;" 
| 82 || July 7  || Brewers || 4–3  || Díaz (3–2) || Suter (8–4) || — || Citi Field (20,953) || 45–37
|- style="background:#fbb;"
| 83 || July 7  || Brewers || 0–5  || Cousins (1–0) || Stock (0–2) || — || Citi Field (13,218) || 45–38
|- style="background:#bbb;" 
| — || July 8 || Pirates || colspan=8| Postponed (Rain, Makeup: July 10)
|- style="background:#bfb;"
| 84 || July 9 || Pirates || 13–4 || Loup (3–0) || Brubaker (4–9) || — || Citi Field (20,350) || 46–38
|- style="background:#fbb;" 
| 85 || July 10  || Pirates || 2–6  || Anderson (5–8) || Stroman (6–7) || — || Citi Field (N/A) || 46–39
|- style="background:#bfb;" 
| 86 || July 10  || Pirates || 4–2  || Familia (4–1) || Kranick (1–1) || Díaz (19) || Citi Field (31,924) || 47–39
|- style="background:#fbb;" 
| 87 || July 11 || Pirates || 5–6 || Bednar (2–1) || Díaz (3–3) || Rodríguez (12) || Citi Field (26,420) || 47–40
|-style=background:#bff
|colspan="10"|91st All-Star Game in Denver, Colorado
|- style="background:#fbb;" 
| 88 || July 16 || @ Pirates || 1–4 || Kuhl (3–5) || Stroman (6–8) || Rodríguez (13) || PNC Park (18,119) || 47–41
|- style="background:#fbb;" 
| 89 || July 17 || @ Pirates || 7–9 || Holmes (3–2) || Díaz (3–4) || — || PNC Park (27,222) || 47–42
|- style="background:#bfb;"
| 90 || July 18 || @ Pirates || 7–6 || Familia (5–1) || Rodríguez (4–2) || May (2) || PNC Park (17,837) || 48–42
|- style="background:#bfb;" 
| 91 || July 19 || @ Reds || 15–11  || Banda (1–0) || García (0–1) || May (3) || Great American Ball Park  (17,080) || 49–42
|- style="background:#fbb;" 
| 92 || July 20 || @ Reds || 3–4 || Miley (8–4) || Nogosek (0–1) || Garrett (7) || Great American Ball Park (19,096) || 49–43
|- style="background:#bfb;" 
| 93 || July 21 || @ Reds || 7–0 || Stroman (7–8) || Hoffman (3–5) || — || Great American Ball Park (19,896) || 50–43
|- style="background:#bfb;" 
| 94 || July 23 || Blue Jays || 3–0 || Megill (1–0) || Matz (8–5) || Díaz (20) || Citi Field (28,126) || 51–43
|- style="background:#fbb;" 
| 95 || July 24 || Blue Jays || 3–10 || Richards (4–0) || Walker (7–4) || — || Citi Field (29,269) || 51–44
|- style="background:#bfb;" 
| 96 || July 25 || Blue Jays || 5–4 || Lugo (3–1) || Barnes (1–2) || Díaz (21) || Citi Field (23,675) || 52–44
|- style="background:#fbb;" 
| 97 || July 26  || Braves || 0–2  || Muller (2–3) || Stroman (7–9) || Smith (20) || Citi Field (N/A) || 52–45
|- style="background:#bfb;" 
| 98 || July 26  || Braves || 1–0  || May (3–2) || Jackson (1–2) || Díaz (22) || Citi Field (24,384) || 53–45
|- style="background:#fbb;" 
| 99 || July 27 || Braves || 5–12 || Morton (10–3) || Eickhoff (0–2) || — || Citi Field (24,000) || 53–46
|- style="background:#bfb;" 
| 100 || July 28 || Braves || 2–1 || May (4–2) || Fried (7–7) || Díaz (23) || Citi Field (25,787) || 54–46
|- style="background:#fbb;"
| 101 || July 29 || Braves || 3–6 || Chavez (1–2) || Walker (7–5) || Smith (21) || Citi Field (26,080) || 54–47
|- style="background:#fbb;" 
| 102 || July 30 || Reds || 2–6 || Gray (3–6) || Castro (2–3) || — || Citi Field (31,787) || 54–48
|- style="background:#bfb;" 
| 103 || July 31 || Reds || 5–4  || Díaz (4–4) || Cessa (3–2) || — || Citi Field (26,477) || 55–48
|-

|- style="background:#fbb;" 
| 104 || August 1 || Reds || 1–7 || Gutiérrez (6–3) || Stroman (7–10) || — || Citi Field (23,443) || 55–49
|- style="background:#fbb;" 
| 105 || August 2 || @ Marlins || 3–6 || Luzardo (3–4) || Megill (1–1) || Floro (3) || LoanDepot Park (8,771) || 55–50
|- style="background:#fbb;" 
| 106 || August 3 || @ Marlins || 4–5 || Neidert (1–1) || Walker (7–6) || Floro (4) || LoanDepot Park (7,682) || 55–51
|- style="background:#bfb;" 
| 107 || August 4 || @ Marlins || 5–3 || Castro (3–3) || Bass (1–7) || May (4) || LoanDepot Park (9,760) || 56–51
|- style="background:#fbb;" 
| 108 || August 5 || @ Marlins || 2–4 || Detwiler (2–1) || Familia (5–2) || Bender (2) || LoanDepot Park (9,745) || 56–52
|- style="background:#fbb;" 
| 109 || August 6 || @ Phillies || 2–4 || Gibson (8–3) || Stroman (7–11) || Kennedy (17) || Citizens Bank Park (30,106) || 56–53
|- style="background:#fbb;" 
| 110 || August 7 || @ Phillies || 3–5 || Hammer (1–0) || Megill (1–2) || Kennedy (18) || Citizens Bank Park (37,057) || 56–54
|- style="background:#fbb;" 
| 111 || August 8 || @ Phillies || 0–3 || Wheeler (10–6) || Walker (7–7) || — || Citizens Bank Park (39,186) || 56–55
|- style="background:#bfb;" 
| 112 || August 10/11 || Nationals || 8–7 || May (5–2) || Thompson (0–1) || Díaz (24) || Citi Field (N/A) || 57–55
|- style="background:#bbb;" 
| — || August 11 || Nationals || colspan=8| Postponed (Rain, Makeup: August 12)
|- style="background:#bfb;" 
| 113 || August 12  || Nationals || 4–1  || Stroman (8–11) || Nolin (0–1) || Díaz (25) || Citi Field (N/A) || 58–55
|- style="background:#bfb;" 
| 114 || August 12  || Nationals || 5–4  || Familia (6–2) || Finnegan (4–4) || — || Citi Field (25,870) || 59–55
|- style="background:#fbb;" 
| 115 || August 13 || Dodgers || 5–6  || Jansen (2–4) || Familia (6–3) || — || Citi Field (38,395) || 59–56
|- style="background:#fbb;"  
| 116 || August 14 || Dodgers || 1–2  || Bickford (2–1) || Díaz (0–2) || Knebel (3) || Citi Field (38,669) || 59–57
|- style="background:#fbb;" 
| 117 || August 15 || Dodgers || 4–14 || Scherzer (10–4) || Carrasco (0–1) || — || Citi Field (31,205) || 59–58
|- style="background:#fbb;" 
| 118 || August 16 || @ Giants || 5–7 || Gausman (12–5) || Castro (3–4) || McGee (26) || Oracle Park (23,511) || 59–59
|- style="background:#fbb;" 
| 119 || August 17 || @ Giants || 2–3 || Webb (7–3) || Stroman (8–12) || Leone (1) || Oracle Park (23,610) || 59–60
|- style="background:#bfb;" 
| 120 || August 18 || @ Giants || 6–2  || Familia (7–3) || Chatwood (1–3) || — || Oracle Park (25,360) || 60–60
|- style="background:#fbb;”
| 121 || August 19 || @ Dodgers || 1–4 || Phillips (0–1) || Walker (7–8) || Treinen (4) || Dodger Stadium (42,133) || 60–61
|- style="background:#fbb;” 
| 122 || August 20 || @ Dodgers || 2–3 || Buehler (12–3) || Carrasco (0–2) || Jansen (26) || Dodger Stadium (48,117) || 60–62
|- style="background:#fbb;” 
| 123 || August 21 || @ Dodgers || 3–4 || Scherzer (11–4) || Hill (6–5) || Jansen (27) || Dodger Stadium (44,783) || 60–63
|- style="background:#bfb;" 
| 124 || August 22 || @ Dodgers || 7–2 || Stroman (9–12) || Price (4–2) || — || Dodger Stadium (52,749) || 61–63
|- style="background:#fbb;" 
| 125 || August 24 || Giants || 0–8 || Long (2–1) || Megill (1–3) || — || Citi Field (28,558) || 61–64
|- style="background:#fbb;" 
| 126 || August 25 || Giants || 2–3 || Watson (5–3) || Walker (7–9) || McGee (29) || Citi Field (24,384) || 61–65
|- style="background:#fbb;" 
| 127 || August 26 || Giants || 2–3 || García (5–3) || Lugo (3–2) || Rogers (12) || Citi Field (25,000) || 61–66
|- style="background:#fbb;" 
| 128 || August 27 || Nationals || 1–2 || Espino (4–4) || Hill (6–6) || Finnegan (6) || Citi Field (20,276) || 61–67
|- style="background:#bfb;" 
| 129 || August 28 || Nationals || 5–3 || May (6–2) || Harper (0–1) || Díaz (26) || Citi Field (27,870) || 62–67
|- style="background:#bfb;" 
| 130 || August 29 || Nationals || 9–4 || Megill (2–3) || Fedde (6–9) || — || Citi Field (24,247) || 63–67
|- style="background:#bfb;" 
| 131 || August 31  || Marlins || 6–5 || Familia (8–3) || Floro (0–1) || — || Citi Field (8,199) || 64–67
|- style="background:#bfb;" 
| 132 || August 31  || Marlins || 3–1  || Loup (4–0) || Cabrera (0–1) || Díaz (27) || Citi Field (18,101) || 65–67
|-

|- style="background:#bbb;"
| – || September 1 || Marlins || colspan=8| Postponed (Rain, Makeup: September 28)
|- style="background:#bfb;" 
| 133 || September 2 || Marlins || 4–3 || Familia (9–3) || Alcántara (8–13) || Díaz (28) || Citi Field (23,737) || 66–67
|- style="background:#bfb;" 
| 134 || September 3 || @ Nationals || 6–2  || Díaz (5–4) || Voth (3–1) || — || Nationals Park (26,779) || 67–67
|- style="background:#bfb;" 
| 135 || September 4  || @ Nationals || 11–9  || May (7–2) || Finnegan (4–6) || Hembree (9) || Nationals Park (13,916) || 68–67
|- style="background:#fbb;" 
| 136 || September 4  || @ Nationals || 3–4  || Rogers (1–0) || Megill (2–4) || Finnegan (7) || Nationals Park (22,420) || 68–68
|- style="background:#bfb;" 
| 137 || September 5 || @ Nationals || 13–6 || Loup (5–0) || Machado (1–2) || — || Nationals Park (22,162) || 69–68
|- style="background:#fbb;" 
| 138 || September 6 || @ Nationals || 3–4 || Finnegan (5–6) || Díaz (5–5) || — || Nationals Park (17,623) || 69–69
|- style="background:#bfb;" 
| 139 || September 7 || @ Marlins || 9–4 || Carrasco (1–2) || Campbell (1–3) || — || LoanDepot Park (5,848) || 70–69
|- style="background:#fbb;" 
| 140 || September 8 || @ Marlins || 1–2  || Bender (3–2) || Díaz (5–6) || — || LoanDepot Park (6,378) || 70–70
|- style="background:#fbb;" 
| 141 || September 9 || @ Marlins || 2–3 || Bleier (3–2) || Familia (9–4) || Floro (9) || LoanDepot Park (8,075) || 70–71
|- style="background:#bfb;" 
| 142 || September 10 || Yankees || 10–3 || Megill (3–4) || Montgomery (5–6) || — || Citi Field (37,288) || 71–71
|- style="background:#fbb;" 
| 143 || September 11 || Yankees || 7–8 || Holmes (7–3) || May (7–3) || Chapman (26) || Citi Field (43,144) || 71–72
|- style="background:#bfb;" 
| 144 || September 12 || Yankees || 7–6 || Lugo (4–2) || Green (7–7) || Díaz (29) || Citi Field (33,805) || 72–72
|- style="background:#fbb;" 
| 145 || September 13 || Cardinals || 0–7 || Wainwright (16–7) || Hill (6–7) || — || Citi Field (19,057) || 72–73
|- style="background:#fbb;" 
| 146 || September 14 || Cardinals || 6–7  || Reyes (8–8) || Reed (0–1) || Kim (1) || Citi Field (21,825) || 72–74
|- style="background:#fbb;" 
| 147 || September 15 || Cardinals || 4–11 || Lester (6–6) || Megill (3–5) || — || Citi Field (21,001) || 72–75
|- style="background:#fbb;" 
| 148 || September 17 || Phillies || 3–4 || Wheeler (14–9) || Walker (7–10) || Kennedy (23) || Citi Field (26,967) || 72–76
|- style="background:#fbb;" 
| 149 || September 18 || Phillies || 3–5 || Nola (8–8) || Carrasco (1–3) || Kennedy (24) || Citi Field (33,442) || 72–77
|- style="background:#bfb;" 
| 150 || September 19 || Phillies || 3–2 || Loup (6–0) || Gibson (10–8) || Díaz (30) || Citi Field (24,832) || 73–77
|- style="background:#fbb;" 
| 151 || September 21 || @ Red Sox || 3–6 || Brasier (1–1) || Stroman (9–13) || — || Fenway Park (32,146) || 73–78
|- style="background:#fbb;"
| 152 || September 22 || @ Red Sox || 5–12 || Sale (5–0) || Walker (7–11) || — || Fenway Park (30,254) || 73–79
|- style="background:#fbb;" 
| 153 || September 24 || @ Brewers || 1–5 || Lauer (7–5) || Megill (3–6) || — || American Family Field (27,452) || 73–80
|- style="background:#fbb;" 
| 154 || September 25 || @ Brewers || 1–2 || Burnes (11–4) || Hill (6–8) || Hader (34) || American Family Field (35,388) || 73–81
|- style="background:#fbb;" 
| 155 || September 26 || @ Brewers || 4–8 || Peralta (10–5) || Carrasco (1–4) || — || American Family Field (43,430) || 73–82
|- style="background:#bfb;" 
| 156 || September 28  || Marlins || 5–2  || Stroman (10–13) || Thompson (2–7) || Díaz (31) || Citi Field (N/A) || 74–82
|- style="background:#bfb;" 
| 157 || September 28  || Marlins || 2–1  || Hand (6–7) || Bass (3–9) || — || Citi Field (20,647) || 75–82
|- style="background:#fbb;" 
| 158 || September 29 || Marlins || 2–3 || Okert (3–1) || Lugo (4–3) || Floro (13) || Citi Field (22,610) || 75–83
|- style="background:#bfb;" 
| 159 || September 30 || Marlins || 12–3 || Hill (7–8) || Guenther (0–1) || — || Citi Field (24,312) || 76–83
|- style="background:#bfb;" 
| 160 || October 1 || @ Braves || 4–3 || Megill (4–6) || Ynoa (4–6) || Díaz (32) || Truist Park (32,659) || 77–83
|- style="background:#fbb;" 
| 161 || October 2 || @ Braves || 5–6 || Smyly (11–4) || Carrasco (1–5) || Webb (1) || Truist Park (37,616) || 77–84
|- style="background:#fbb;" 
| 162 || October 3 || @ Braves || 0–5 || Strider (1–0) || Syndergaard (0–1) || — || Truist Park (33,202) || 77–85
|-

Roster

Farm system

Notes

References

External links
 2021 New York Mets season at Baseball Reference

New York Mets seasons
New York Mets season
New York Mets
2020s in Queens
Flushing, Queens